Kochpara is a census town in Kamrup district in the Indian state of Assam.

Demographics
 India census, Kochpara had a population of 6028. Males constitute 51% of the population and females 49%. Kochpara has an average literacy rate of 85%, higher than the national average of 59.5%: male literacy is 89%, and female literacy is 81%. In Kochpara, 9% of the population is under 6 years of age.

References

Cities and towns in Kamrup district